Cafe Nell is a restaurant in Portland, Oregon's Northwest District, United States. The restaurant was owned by Darren and Van Creely, as of 2014, and serves French cuisine.

History
The restaurant opened in September 2008, occupying a space which previously housed Cafe des Amis from 1982 to 2003, and later Hurley's. Cafe Nell has been mentioned on the television series Grimm multiple times, including the episodes "The Hour of Death", "Death Do Us Part", and "Blood Magic". Andrew Garrett once served as chef.

Reception
In his review of the restaurant, David Sarasohn of The Oregonian gave Cafe Nell a 'B' rating.

See also
 List of French restaurants

References

External links

 
 Café Nell at Lonely Planet
 Cafe Nell at Zagat

2008 establishments in Oregon
French restaurants in Portland, Oregon
Northwest District, Portland, Oregon
Restaurants established in 2008